Pennsylvania Railroad's Odd D #10003 was an experimental electric locomotive built in 1907 by Baldwin and Westinghouse. It had a 4-4-0 wheel arrangement in the Whyte notation, or 2-B in the AAR scheme.  On the PRR, class D was assigned to 4-4-0 locomotives.  Production classes of locomotive were assigned a number after the letter, but one-off locomotives were simply designated "Odd".

In testing, #10003 proved to be more stable at speed than the two class AA1 B-B locomotives the PRR had also constructed, so its 4-4-0 arrangement and high center of gravity was chosen as the design for the PRR's DD1 production locomotives.

Footnotes

References

External links
LIRR Early Electric Engines (TrainsAreFun.com)

4-4-0 locomotives
D (Odd) #10003
11 kV AC locomotives
Experimental locomotives
Individual locomotives of the United States
Electric locomotives of the United States
Railway locomotives introduced in 1907
Scrapped locomotives
Unique locomotives
Standard gauge locomotives of the United States